Krásný Les is a municipality and village in Karlovy Vary District in the Karlovy Vary Region of the Czech Republic. It has about 300 inhabitants.

Administrative parts
Villages of Damice and Horní Hrad are administrative parts of Krásný Les.

Geography
It lies in the Ore Mountains. The Ohře River forms the southern municipal border.

History

The first written mention of Krásný Les is from 1226. In the second half of the 13th century, the royal castle of Hauenštejn was founded, and Krásný Les became a part of the Hauenštejn estate.

Prior to 1945, the village was mostly populated by Germans. As a result of World War II, the Germans were expelled and replaced with Czechs.

Between 1982 and 1992, Krásný Les was an administrative part of Ostrov.

Sights
The most notable monument is the Horní hrad Castle, also called Hauenštejn. It was probably founded in the second half of the 13th century, but there is also possibility that it was founded around 1320 by its first known owner, the Loket burgrave Mikuláš Winkler. In around 1600, during the rule of the Schlick family, after the castle was damaged by a fire, it was rebuilt in the Renaissance style. In 1878–1882, Ferdinand Bucquoy had the castle rebuilt in the English Gothic Revival style. In the mid-20th century, the castle became a ruin, but was reconstructed at the end of the 20th century, and today it is open to the public. The castle also includes an arboretum and botanical garden.

References

External links

Villages in Karlovy Vary District
Villages in the Ore Mountains